Jo Ann Sayers (born Miriam Lucille Lilygren, October 22, 1918 – November 14, 2011) was an American actress who was active in Broadway and in Hollywood films. Her film career spanned the 1930s through the 1950s.

Biography
Sayers was born in Seattle, Washington. She was a budding actress as a child, participating in dances, taking piano and violin lessons, and acting in school plays. She enrolled in Pre-law at the University of Washington, also taking drama classes. A talent scout noted her in a student production and invited her to Hollywood for a screen test. She was offered a contract with Metro-Goldwyn-Mayer. Her first credited film role was in 1938.

In 1940, she was selected for the titular role in the Broadway production of My Sister Eileen, opposite Shirley Booth, who was two decades Sayers' senior, which opened on December 26, 1940.

Marriages
She remained in the Broadway cast until June 1942, when she left to marry Anthony A. Bliss, a New York lawyer and patron of the performing arts.

They married on June 10, 1942 and had three children, but later divorced. Sayers later worked in summer theater, radio and television. She married a second time in 1968 to architect Charles K. Agle; they remained together until his death in Princeton, New Jersey.

Affiliations
 
Sayers continued to support the arts and was a member of the Princeton University Concerts Committee, the president of Friends of Music at Princeton University, and a community fellow of Mathey College at the University.

Death
Sayers died on November 14, 2011, aged 93, in Princeton, New Jersey.

Selected filmography
 
Main Street to Broadway (1953) (uncredited) .... Bride in Musical Number
The Light of the Western Stars (1940) .... Majesty Hammond
The Man With Nine Lives (1940) .... Nurse Judith Blair
Drunk Driving (1939) .... Mrs. Jones
The Women (1939) (uncredited) .... Debutante 
Fast and Loose (1939) .... Christina 'Chris' Torrent 
Honolulu (1939) .... Nurse
The Adventures of Huckleberry Finn (1939) .... Susan
Young Dr. Kildare (1938) .... Barbara

References

External links
 

1918 births
2011 deaths
Actresses from Seattle
American film actresses
American radio actresses
American stage actresses
American television actresses
People from Princeton, New Jersey
Place of death missing
20th-century American actresses
University of Washington alumni
21st-century American women